The Phoenix Subdivision is a railroad line in the U.S. state of Arizona owned by the BNSF Railway. The line is part of a system of proposed commuter rail lines in the Phoenix metropolitan area.

The line from Williams to Ash fork was initially laid out by the Atlantic and Pacific Railroad, though much of this section was reconstructed by the Atchison, Topeka and Santa Fe Railway (predecessor to BNSF) in 1960 to bypass several sharp curves and steep gradients. South of Ash Fork the route largely follows the original Santa Fe, Prescott and Phoenix Railway, except for segments around Prescott which were similarly bypassed in the 1960s.

References

BNSF Railway lines